Srem Gap (‘Sremska Sedlovina’ \'srem-ska se-dlo-vi-'na\) is the flat saddle of elevation 813 m extending 1.35 km on Trinity Peninsula, Antarctic Peninsula, which is situated between Russell West Glacier to the northwest and a tributary glacier to Russell East Glacier to the southeast.  Linking Irakli Peak and Trakiya Heights to the southwest, and Mount Canicula to the northeast.

The feature is named after the settlement of Srem in southeastern Bulgaria.

Location
German-British mapping in 1996.

Maps
 Trinity Peninsula. Scale 1:250000 topographic map No. 5697. Institut für Angewandte Geodäsie and British Antarctic Survey, 1996.
 Antarctic Digital Database (ADD). Scale 1:250000 topographic map of Antarctica. Scientific Committee on Antarctic Research (SCAR). Since 1993, regularly updated.

Notes

References
 Bulgarian Antarctic Gazetteer. Antarctic Place-names Commission. (details in Bulgarian, basic data in English)
 Srem Gap. SCAR Composite Antarctic Gazetteer.

External links
 Srem Gap. Copernix satellite image

Mountain passes of Trinity Peninsula
Bulgaria and the Antarctic